The Rural Municipality of Good Lake No. 274 is a rural municipality (RM) in the Canadian province of Saskatchewan within Census Division No. 9 and  Division No. 4.

History 
The RM of Good Lake No. 274 incorporated as a rural municipality on January 1, 1913.

Geography

Communities and localities 
The following urban municipalities are surrounded by the RM.

Towns
 Canora

The following unincorporated communities are within the RM.

Organized hamlets
 Burgis Beach
 Good Spirit Acres

Localities
 Burgis
 Canora Beach
 Donald Gunn
 Drobot
 Gorlitz
 Kitchimanitou Beach
 Whitesand

Demographics 

Attractions 
 Canora Station House Museum
 Good Spirit Lake Provincial Park
 Horseshoe Lake Provincial Wildlife Refuge
 Whitesand Regional Park
 Whitesand River Recreation Site

Government 
The RM of Good Lake No. 274 is governed by an elected municipal council and an appointed administrator that meets on the second Monday of every month. The reeve of the RM is David Popowich while its administrator is Diane Jamieson. The RM's office is located in Canora.

Transportation 
 Saskatchewan Highway 5
 Saskatchewan Highway 9
 Saskatchewan Highway 47
 Saskatchewan Highway 229
 Saskatchewan Highway 726
 Saskatchewan Highway 746
 Canadian National Railway
 Canora station
 Canora Airport

See also 
 List of rural municipalities in Saskatchewan

References

External links 

G

Division No. 9, Saskatchewan